Fathom Dynamic Data Software is software for learning and teaching statistics, at the high school and introductory college level.

Reviews
Technology & Learning Award of Excellence
MacWorld 2005 Review
EHO Review

Statistical software